The Campeonato Roraimense is the football league of the state of Roraima, Brazil.

Format

First Division

First Stage
Standard round-robin, in which all teams play each other once.

Second Stage
Teams are divided in two groups of four. 
First stage: standard round-robin, in which teams play each other once within the group.
Second stage: playoffs with the top 2 teams of each group.

If a team wins both stages, it is crowned the state champion. If not, a playoff with the winners is disputed, and the winner is declared the state champion.

As in any other Brazilian soccer championship, the format can change every year.

Clubs

First Division

Atlético Progresso Clube
Atlético Rio Negro Clube
Atlético Roraima Clube
Baré Esporte Clube
Grêmio Atlético Sampaio (GAS)
Náutico Futebol Clube
Ríver Esporte Clube
São Raimundo Esporte Clube

List of champions

Amateur era

Federação Riobranquense de Desportos

Federação Roraimense de Desportos

Federação Roraimense de Futebol

Professional era

Titles by team

Teams in bold stills active.

External links
RSSSF
Soccerway Website

 
Roraimense
North Region, Brazil